Kuntur Nasa may refer to:
 Kuntur Nasa (Oruro), a mountain in the Challapata Municipality, Oruro Department, Bolivia
 Kuntur Nasa (Potosí), a mountain in the Yocalla Municipality, Potosí Department, Bolivia